Eumysia mysiella is a species of snout moth. It was described by Harrison Gray Dyar Jr. in 1905. It is found in the US state of California.

References

Moths described in 1905
Phycitinae